Agnimitra Paul is an Indian fashion designer turned politician who serves as the Member of the West Bengal Legislative Assembly from Asansol South and as the President of the West Bengal unit of BJP Mahila Morcha. Prior to entering politics she was a Kolkata-based fashion designer.

Personal life 

Agnimitra Paul was born into a family of doctors and academicians. Her father Dr. Ashok Roy is a paediatrician in Asansol. She completed her schooling from Loreto Convent and Asansol Girls' College She completed her bachelor's degree in Botany (Honours) in Banwarilal Bhalotia College.

She is married to Partho Paul, an entrepreneur. They have two children.

Career in fashion
Paul as a fashion designer, designed clothes for several Bollywood films such as Koi Mere Dil Se Pooche and Via Darjeeling.

She has designed costumes and personal wardrobes for Sridevi, Esha Deol, Mithun Chakraborthy, Shonal Rawat, Kay Kay Menon, Sonali Kulkarni, Vinay Pathak and Parvin Dabas.

She started her own fashion label "Inga" across many cities in India. Paul also designed for the Lakme Fashion Week Summer/Resort 2013.

Former US Secretary of State Hillary Clinton was presented with shawls and blankets that Paul designed.

Political career

Paul joined the Bharatiya Janata Party in March 2019.

In 2020, Paul became the BJP Mahila Morcha president of West Bengal succeeding Locket Chatterjee.

As the BJP Mahila Morcha president, she organised self-defence training workshop called  "Uma" for women across 23 districts in the state.

She defeated TMC's Saayoni Ghosh in the 2021 West Bengal Legislative Assembly election from Asansol Dakshin Vidhan Sabha.

References

Bharatiya Janata Party politicians from West Bengal
Bengali people
People from Asansol
Living people
1973 births
Jadavpur University alumni
Indian women fashion designers
Indian costume designers
21st-century Indian women artists
21st-century Indian businesswomen
21st-century Indian businesspeople
West Bengal MLAs 2021–2026